Nawamis (singular: namus) are circular prehistoric stone tombs located in the Sinai desert of Egypt, Yemen and Oman. The bones found in the tombs of Egypt date from 4000–3150 BCE.

Some authorities believe that the stone structures are younger than the remains found therein.

Location in Egypt

There are two spots with Nawamis on the road from Dahab to Saint Catherine:
 Hdhabat Chajaj Nawamis (usually pictured), coordinates: 28.51'19.48N, 34.22'24.62E
 Al trefiya Nawamis (only ruins survive).

Nawamis in Sultanate of Oman

Nawamis tombs were found in the areas of Bat, al-Khutm and al-Ayn in Oman.

Nawamis in Yemen

Nawamis tombs were found in the Jebel Ruwaik area in Yemen.

References

External links
YouTube video of Nawamis

Sinai Peninsula
Masonry